The University of Swat is a public sector university. The main campus of the university is situated in Charbagh, 20 km away from the main city Mingora, Swat District, Khyber Pakhtunkhwa, Pakistan.

History
On 29 May 2010 the establishment of the University of Swat was announced by the prime minister of Pakistan during his visit to Swat valley. The university came into formal existence in July 2010 by the order of Honorable Governor of Khyber Pakhtunkhwa, Mr. Awais Ahmad Ghani with the prior approval of the President of Pakistan. Its first Vice Chancellor Dr. Muhammad Farooq Khan (Shaheed) was appointed in August 2010. The Higher Education Department handed over two buildings to the university located at Saidu sharif swat. Land Acquisition for the university's own campus has been carried out and construction on the project is ongoing. Various buildings have been completed and recently the two departments have been shifted to main campus under supervision of Dr. Muhammad Jamal, Vice Chancellor.

In its first academic session (2010–11) the university opened seven departments.

Vice chancellors
 Dr. Muhammad Farooq Khan
 Prof. Dr. Muhammad Farooq Swati (acting)
 Prof. Dr. Muhammad Jahanzeb Khan Yosafzai – from 3 Dec 2011 to 2 Dec 2015
 Prof. Dr. Jehan Bakht (acting) – from 7 Dec 2015 t0 Jun 9, 2017
 Prof. Dr. Muhammad Jamal Khan – from 20 Dec 2017 till 18 December 2022
 Prof. Dr. Hassan Sher (Acting) - from 18 December, 2022 till date

Registrar
 Mr. Muhammad Riaz
 Mr. Mahboob Ur Rahman
 Mr. ZahidUllah
 Dr. Hassan Sher
 Mr. Sher Alam Khan

Additional Registrar(s)
Mr. Imtiaz Ali

Deputy Registrar(s)
 Mr Imtiaz Ali - Deputy Registrar Establishment
 Mr. Fayyaz Ahmed Khan –  Deputy Registrar Academics
 Mr. Khurshid Alam Khan Yusufzai –  Deputy Registrar Meetings

Deputy Controller(s)
 Mr. Aziz Ur Rehman

Athletics

The athletics team represented the university at the Higher Education Commission Pakistan Inter varsity Championship 2014 held on 22–24 April 2014 at the Pakistan Sport Complex, Islamabad.

The University Athletics team consisted of 12 players.

Declamation Contests
Allama Iqbal declamation contest are yearly held in the University of Swat to promote new talent in regarding Debates, Declamations. Most raging debtors of University are Riaz Ali (Dept. of Law and Sharia), Izhar Ahmad (Dept. of Economics), Fahad Khan (Dept. of commerce and management sciences), Kabir (Dept. of Law and Sharia), Arshad Ali (Dept. of Law and Sharia), Rahseed Ahmad Faizi (Dept. of Law and Sharia).

KPK IPYEP 2016

The university shortlisted top students based on merit from the most senior batches of all Bachelor and master's degree Programs and communicated. The ten students were interviewed by the directorate of sports and youth affairs Khyber Pakhtunkhwa and two students (Biotechnology 7th semester student Mr. Ashfaq Ahmad and one female student of zoology Department ) were finalized to represent University of Swat during Inter Provincial Youth Exchange program (IPYEP) 2016. They were part of delegation which represented KPK in Karachi and Islamabad/AJK one week trip.

Departments 
In its first session (2010–11) the university opened the following eight disciplines:
 Department of Business Administration
 Department of Computer Science
 Department of Development Studies
 Department of Mass Communication
 Department of Economics
 Department of Education
 Department of Law and Shari'a
 Department of Statistics
 Department of Environmental Science

In the 2011–12 session, one discipline of Software Engineering and four more departments, of Zoology, Microbiology and Environmental Sciences at BS level, were introduced. There are now the following schools/institutes/departments with 3500+ students:
 Center for Agriculture Sciences and Forestry
 Center for Animal Science and Fisheries
 Center for Biotechnology & Microbiology
 Center for Earth Sciences
 Center for Education and Staff Training
 Center for Management & Commerce
 Center for Plant Science and Biodiversity
 Department of Applied Physical and Material Sciences
 Department of Computer and Software Technologies
 Department of Economics and Development Studies
 Department of English and Foreign Languages
 Department of Environmental and Conservation Sciences
 Department of Forensic Studies
 Department of Health and Physical Education
 Department of Islamic and Arabic Studies
 Department of Law & Shari’a
 Department of Library and Information Studies
 Department of Mathematics & Statistics
 Department of Media & Communication Studies
 Department of Political and International Studies
 Department of Psychological Studies
 Department of Social and Gender Studies
 Institute of Chemical Sciences
 Institute of Cultural Heritage, Tourism and Hospitality Management

Institutes
 Institute of Culture Heritage, Tourism and Hospitality Management (ICHTHM)
The Institute of Cultural Heritage, Tourism and Hospitality Management has been established with a view to save the cultural heritage of the Swat region, to establish an archaeological and ethnic profile of the region, to explore the genesis of the cultural activities, to trace the complex and rich historical past of the ancient period of the country, to promote Eco- and cultural tourism of Pakistan in general and the Malakand division and the Northern Areas in particular, and to impart quality education at graduate, undergraduate and postgraduate levels at par with the international standards. The present Head of Department is Dr. Zarawar Khan and the coordinator is Muhammad Wali Ullah.

The Chancellor Prof. Dr. Muhammad Jahanzeb Khan established the Institute of Cultural Heritage, Tourism and Hospitality Management.

 Center for Biotechnology & Microbiology(CBM)
The Center for Biotechnology & Microbiology is a newly launched discipline at University of Swat.

The focus of the institute is on the applied aspect of Biotechnology, Microbiology and Genetics. The aim of the department is to produce experts in the fields of medicine, agriculture, industry, the environment, genetics and Recombinant DNA technology.

Ranking
 In Pakistan ranked 124 according to the Higher Education Commission of Pakistan in 2012
 Chartered by Government of Khyber Pakhtunkhwa, Pakistan, on 17 in 2012

Course levels and areas of studies

Books
Books Related to the University of Swat:

 Kashmir Issue (Urdu & English), by Former Vice Chancellor University of Swat Muhammad Farooq Khan(late).
 Dialogue with the West (English),  by Former Vice Chancellor University of Swat Muhammad Farooq Khan(late).
 Hidden Treasures of Swat (2014), by Dildar Ali Khan'' (Student at Institute of Cultural Heritage, Tourism and Hospitality Management University of Swat.

References

External links
 University of Swat unofficial Facebook Page

2010 establishments in Pakistan
Educational institutions established in 2010
Public universities and colleges in Khyber Pakhtunkhwa
Swat District